Pak Ui-chun ( or  ; born 15 August 1932) is a North Korean diplomat and politician. He was the minister for foreign affairs of the Democratic People's Republic of Korea and was replaced by Ri Su-yong following the 2014 North Korean parliamentary election.

Pak began his diplomatic career in 1972, and went on to serve as ambassador of North Korea to Algeria, Syria and Lebanon. From 1989 to 2007, he served as ambassador to Russia, before being appointed Foreign Affairs Minister upon the death in office of his predecessor Paek Nam-sun.

See also
Mun Jong-nam

References

External links
 Pak Ui-chun's address to the 63rd session of the United Nations General Assembly, September 27, 2008

North Korean diplomats
Ambassadors of North Korea to Syria
Living people
People from South Hamgyong
Ambassadors of North Korea to Russia
Government ministers of North Korea
Foreign ministers of North Korea
1932 births